Paulinka, Pavlinka or Pavlínka is a Slavic-language diminutive of the female given name Paulina, Pavlina, Pavla.

Paulinka or Pavlinka may also refer to:

Paulinka, nom de guerre of Anna Jakubowska, participant of the Warsaw Uprising
Paulinka, Masovian Voivodship, a village in Poland
, a village in Belarus
Paulinka (play) a play by Belarusian poet and writer Yanka Kupala
Paulinka Bimbam, a character from Charlotte Salomon (opera) 
Pavlinka, a character from Most (2003 film)
Pavlinka, a crater on Venus
Pavlinka, a former settlement within the cadastre of Bernartice (Jeseník District), Czech Republic
Crystal Paulinka («Хрустальная Павлинка»), the main prize of the Union of the Theatre Workers of Belarus

be:Паўлінка (значэнні)